Rúben Gonçalo da Silva Nascimento Vinagre (born 9 April 1999) is a Portuguese professional footballer who plays as a left wing-back for Premier League club Everton, on loan from Sporting CP.

Club career

Early career
Born in Charneca de Caparica, Almada, Lisbon metropolitan area, Vinagre had two spells in the academy of Sporting CP before joining Ligue 1 club Monaco on 12 June 2015. After spending his first season with the youth side, he signed a professional contract.

In August 2016, a deal was agreed for Vinagre to be loaned to LigaPro side Académica to gain experience, but FIFA, whose approval was required due to the player being under 18, refused to sanction the deal. After an unsuccessful appeal, he returned to his parent club without making any competitive appearances.

Wolverhampton Wanderers
Vinagre agreed to a new deal with Monaco in June 2017, running until summer 2022. Shortly after, he moved on loan to English side Wolverhampton Wanderers for the upcoming season. He made his senior debut on 8 August in a 1–0 win against Yeovil Town in the first round of the EFL Cup. He scored his first goal in professional football on 30 September, the third of his team's 4–0 away victory over Burton Albion in the Championship.

After their promotion to the Premier League as champions, Vinagre signed a five-year-contract for an undisclosed fee on 30 June 2018. The subsequent recruitment of Jonny meant that he was primarily used as a back-up, but still made 17 appearances (21 in all competitions) as they qualified for the UEFA Europa League through a seventh-place finish; his first league match took place on 11 August 2018, when he came on as a late substitute in the 2–2 home draw with Everton.

Vinagre made his European debut on 25 July 2019, in Wolves's 2–0 home win over Crusaders in the Europa League second qualifying round, closing the score in injury time. With Jonny seriously injured, he totalled 13 games in the team's run to the quarter-finals, where they were ousted by eventual winners Sevilla.

On 5 October 2020, Vinagre moved to Olympiacos of the Super League Greece on a season-long loan, with an option to make the deal permanent. However, after failing to impose himself at the Pedro Martins-led squad, mainly due to injury problems, he joined Famalicão also on loan, rejoining former Wolverhampton teammates Leonardo Campana and Bruno Jordão. He made his Primeira Liga debut for the latter on 8 January 2021, starting in a 1–4 home loss to Porto.

Sporting CP
Vinagre was loaned to Sporting on 9 July 2021, with a buying option. He made only 18 competitive appearances in his first season, and on 1 July 2022 the club signed him permanently.

On 27 July 2022, Vinagre joined Everton on a season-long loan; an option to buy was also included in the deal.

International career
Vinagre contributed five appearances as Portugal won the 2016 UEFA European Under-17 Championship in Azerbaijan, following a penalty shoot-out defeat of Spain. He helped the under-19s to the same achievement two years later, playing the entire 4–3 extra-time victory against Italy in Seinäjoki.

On 11 October 2018, Vinagre won his first cap at under-21 level, in a 9–0 rout in Liechtenstein in the 2019 European Championship qualifiers.

Career statistics

Honours
Wolverhampton Wanderers
EFL Championship: 2017–18

Olympiacos
Super League Greece: 2020–21

Sporting CP
Taça da Liga: 2021–22
Supertaça Cândido de Oliveira: 2021

Portugal U17
UEFA European Under-17 Championship: 2016

Portugal U19
UEFA European Under-19 Championship: 2018

Individual
UEFA European Under-17 Championship Team of the Tournament: 2016
UEFA European Under-19 Championship Team of the Tournament: 2018

References

External links

1999 births
Living people
Sportspeople from Almada
Portuguese footballers
Association football defenders
AS Monaco FC players
Premier League players
English Football League players
Wolverhampton Wanderers F.C. players
Everton F.C. players
Super League Greece players
Olympiacos F.C. players
Primeira Liga players
F.C. Famalicão players
Sporting CP footballers
Portugal youth international footballers
Portugal under-21 international footballers
Portuguese expatriate footballers
Expatriate footballers in Monaco
Expatriate footballers in England
Expatriate footballers in Greece
Portuguese expatriate sportspeople in Monaco
Portuguese expatriate sportspeople in England
Portuguese expatriate sportspeople in Greece